The 2012 Fergana Challenger was a professional tennis tournament played on hard courts. It was the 13th edition of the tournament which was part of the 2012 ATP Challenger Tour. It took place in Fergana, Uzbekistan, between 14 and 20 May 2012.

Singles main-draw entrants

Seeds

 1 Rankings on 7 May 2012.

Other entrants
The following players received wildcards into the singles main draw:
  Sarvar Ikramov
  Murad Inoyatov
  Sergey Shipilov
  Nigmat Shofayziev

The following players received entry from the qualifying draw:
  Daniiar Duldaev
  Mikhail Ledovskikh
  Batyr Sapaev
  Vaja Uzakov

The following players received entry as a lucky loser:
  Nikoloz Basilashvili

Champions

Singles

 Yuki Bhambri def.  Amir Weintraub, 6–3, 6–3

Doubles

 Raven Klaasen /  Izak van der Merwe def.  Sanchai Ratiwatana /  Sonchat Ratiwatana, 6–3, 6–4

References

Fergana Challenger
Fergana Challenger